was the founder of the Yamaken-gumi  yakuza gang, who were based in Kobe, Japan.  It is the largest affiliate of the Yamaguchi-gumi.

Biography
Yamamoto was the eldest son in his family. His father was an engineer working for Kawasaki Heavy Industries. In 1942, he graduated from Osaka Electric School, where he worked shortly in the Yokosuka Naval Arsenal before being drafted into the Japanese military Tottori Unit in January 1945.

After the war ended, Yamamoto returned to Kobe. He met up with Hara Masao who was an affiliate of the Yamaguchi-gumi. He was involved in attacking Kōji Tsuruta in January 1953 and was arrested. Shortly after, he was involved with attacking the Tanizaki-gumi in September 1954, for which he was imprisoned for three years in Kakogawa prison. After being released, he received praise from Kazuo Taoka.

He then formed the Yamaken-gumi in 1961.

Kenichi Yamamoto was considered a likely successor to the Yamaguchi-gumi's third godfather Kazuo Taoka, but he died of liver disease on February 4, 1982. His last position at the Yamaguchi-gumi was as wakagashira (the number-two).

References

1925 births
1982 deaths
People from Kobe
Japanese crime bosses
Yakuza members
Yamaguchi-gumi